Nasisten ('The Nazi') was a Nazi weekly newspaper published in Malmö, Sweden, between September 1933 and April 1934.

History and profile
When a first issue of Nasisten was published in September 1933, it was aligned with the National Socialist League. It became an organ for the Swedish National Socialist Unity (formed by National Socialist branches in Skåne in October 1933), then becoming a regional organ of the National Socialist Bloc. It later changed allegiance to the movement of Birger Furugård.

Nasisten carried the by-line 'Organ for the National Socialists of southern Sweden'. J. Levin was the editor of Nasisten.

References

1933 establishments in Sweden
1934 disestablishments in Sweden
Publications established in 1933
Publications disestablished in 1934
Defunct newspapers published in Sweden
Defunct weekly newspapers
Swedish-language newspapers
Weekly newspapers published in Sweden
Mass media in Malmö
Nazi newspapers